The Imperial German Navy  Zeppelin LZ 86 (L-39) was a R-class World War I zeppelin.

Operational history 
Two reconnaissance missions around the North Sea; one attack on England dropping 300 kg bombs.

Destruction   
Returning to Imperial German airspace the airship was destroyed by French flak near Compiègne on 17 March 1917.

Specifications (LZ 80 / Type R zeppelin)

See also

List of Zeppelins

Bibliography 
Notes

References

 - Total pages: 417 

Airships of Germany
Hydrogen airships
Zeppelins